The Unforgiven World Tour is a live album by the Michael Schenker Group, released in 1999.

This is a double-CD live album recorded during three performances in May, 1999 at The Edge, Palo Alto, California. The material dates from throughout Schenker's career, including selections by the Scorpions, UFO, Michael Schenker Group, and his own solo work.

Track listing

Disc one

Disc two

Personnel
Band members
 Michael Schenker – lead guitar
 Keith Slack – vocals
 Kelly Keeling – vocals on tracks 9, 10, 11, 12, 13 of CD 1 and tracks 1, 2 of CD 2
 Wayne Findlay – rhythm guitars, keyboards
 Shane Gaalaas – drums, acoustic guitar on "Bijou Pleasurette"/"Positive Forward"
 Barry Sparks – bass

Production
 Michael Schenker and Mike Varney – producers
 Phil Edwards – engineer
 Ralph Patlan, Joe Marquez, Mike Varney – mixing
 Ralph Patlan, Tim Gennert – mastering
 Dave Stephens – graphic design

References

Michael Schenker Group albums
1999 live albums
SPV/Steamhammer live albums
Albums produced by Mike Varney